John M. Lewellen (September 16, 1930 – November 25, 2017) was an American politician. He was elected and served on the Little Rock City Board of Directors, the Pulaski County Quorum Court and in the Arkansas State Legislature representing the district in which he resided. He was a member of the Arkansas House of Representatives from 1999 to 2004, when he was succeeded by his wife, Wilhelmina Lewellen who served until 2010. John Lewellen is the only Arkansas official to have been elected and represented his district on the city, county and state level.

John Marshall Lewellen was born September 16, 1930 in Forrest City, Arkansas.  He was the 11th of 13 children born to Cornelius and Jesse Lewellen. He attended Dansby Elementary School and  professed a hope in Christ at an early age at Taylor Chapel which was named after his grandfather, Taylor Dansby. 
He graduated from Lincoln High School in Forrest City and served in the U.S. Air Force 1951-1955 during the Korean War. 
 
The first of his family to attend college, John attended Arkansas AM&N (now UAPB) where he met Wilhelmina Epps.  They were married on November 25, 1956.  Their first daughter, Ivie Rochelle, was born while they pursued and completed their college education. 
 
After graduating from AM&N in 1958 with a bachelor's degree in agriculture, John Lewellen and his family moved to the Altheimer/Hermitage area, where he worked as a high school teacher and principal.  After the birth of their second daughter, Cornelia Ann, the family moved to Little Rock, where John began his 30-year career in state government as a state probation officer, state rehabilitation counselor and later as a contractor officer for the Arkansas Department of Human Services.

For 54 years, John Lewellen was a highly respected member of the Little Rock community and his neighborhood.  He gave back to the community by buying and renovating apartments and homes, ultimately purchasing a senior citizen apartment building, which he named ConIvie Gardens, after his two daughters.  He co-founded the Wright Avenue Neighborhood Association, one of the strongest neighborhood groups in the city.  To many, he was "Mr. Lew," the "go-to guy" for advice and guidance, and a mentor to youths, especially young men.  Many would spend Saturdays with him doing yard work, washing cars, or repairing his rental properties, while he taught them the importance of a strong work ethic.

John Lewellen wanted to do even more for the community and decided to run for public office.  He was elected to the Little Rock City Board in 1991 and the Pulaski County Quorum Court in 1996.  In 1999, he was elected to the Arkansas House of Representatives and represented District 34 for six years.  During his tenure he co-founded the Democratic Black Caucus, chaired the Children and Youth subcommittee, and worked to grow minority- and women-owned businesses, among other issues.  He was the lead sponsor of House Bill 1923 - AN ACT TO CREATE THE MOSAIC TEMPLARS OF AMERICA CENTER FOR AFRICAN-AMERICAN CULTURE AND BUSINESS ENTERPRISE.  This legislation generated more than $5 million for restoring the Mosaic Templars Culture Center, a museum of the Department of Arkansas Heritage that houses the Arkansas Black Hall of Fame as well as a collection of African American artifacts. The Mosaic Templars Museum is part of the Arkansas Black Heritage Tour and is Arkansas's only state-funded museum of African American History. John Lewellen received numerous awards for outstanding and dedicated service from organizations including the Arkansas Municipal League, National Association of Minority Contractors, the Arkansas Police and Bar associations, among others.  He ended his tenure in the House in 2004 due to term limits.

Having seen Wilhelmina emerge as a leader in her own right after serving as both Basileus of Beta Pi Omega chapter of Alpha Kappa Alpha sorority and as the president of the local chapter of The Links, Inc., John Lewellen encouraged his wife Wilhelmina to run for his soon-to-be-vacated position.  Wilhelmina reluctantly agreed, though she did not have public office experience. Wilhelmina won with an overwhelming 84 percent of the vote and continued his legacy - and created one of her own - holding the seat until she was also term limited in 2010.

John Lewellen is the only elected official in the State of Arkansas to serve on the City, County and State levels of government.

John Lewellen was a life member of Alpha Phi Alpha, the NAACP, Sigma Pi Phi fraternity, and served on a number of boards and committees.  He was an outdoorsman who loved fishing, animals, and nature. After a lengthy illness, he died early in the morning on November 25, 2017—his and Wilhelmina's 61st wedding anniversary.

References

1930 births
2017 deaths
Democratic Party members of the Arkansas House of Representatives
African-American schoolteachers
Schoolteachers from Arkansas
African-American state legislators in Arkansas
20th-century African-American people
21st-century African-American people
People from Forrest City, Arkansas